
Gmina Zielona Góra was a rural gmina (administrative district) in Zielona Góra County, Lubusz Voivodeship, in western Poland. Its seat was the city of Zielona Góra. Since January 1, 2015 the gmina is a dzielnica of the city.

Villages
Gmina Zielona Góra contained the villages and settlements of Barcikowice, Barcikowiczki, Drzonków, Jany, Jarogniewice, Jeleniów, Kiełpin, Krępa, Krępa Mała, Łężyca, Ługowo, Nowy Kisielin, Ochla, Przydroże, Przylep, Racula, Stary Kisielin, Stożne, Sucha, Zatonie and Zawada.

Neighbouring gminas
Gmina Zielona Góra was bordered by the city of Zielona Góra and by the gminas of Czerwieńsk, Kożuchów, Nowogród Bobrzański, Otyń, Sulechów, Świdnica, Trzebiechów and Zabór.

References

External links
Polish official population figures 2006

Zielona Gora
Zielona Góra County